Fayet may refer to: 
 Fayet, Aisne, a commune in the department of Aisne
 Fayet, Aveyron, a commune in the department of Aveyron
 Fayet-le-Château, a commune in the department of Puy-de-Dôme
 Fayet-Ronaye, a commune in the department of Puy-de-Dôme
 Gustave Fayet, French painter